The Embassy of the People's Republic of China in Ukraine is the diplomatic mission of the People's Republic of China in Ukraine.

History 
Following the Declaration of Independence of Ukraine on 24 August 1991, the People's Republic of China recognised Ukraine as a sovereign state on 27 December 1991. 

Diplomatic relations between Ukraine and China were established on 4 January 1992.

The Embassy relocated to Lviv in March 2022 due to Russian invasion of Ukraine.

Ambassador
The Chinese Ambassador to Ukraine is the official representative of the People's Republic of China to Ukraine.

List of representatives

See also 
 
 China-Ukraine relations
 Foreign relations of China
 Foreign relations of Ukraine
 List of diplomatic missions in Ukraine
 List of diplomatic missions of China

References

External links 
 Chinese Foreign Ministry about relations with Ukraine
  Chinese embassy in Kyiv
 Ministry of Foreign Affairs of Ukraine

China
Kiev
China–Ukraine relations
Hrushevsky Street (Kyiv)